The Beverloo Camp Railway was a  long  gauge railway line in Beverloo Camp near Leopoldsburg in Belgium, which was operated from 1879 to 1940.

History 
The first section of track was laid in 1879 by Paul Decauville. It was extended to Leopoldsburg Station, on the standard gauge railway, in 1914.

The track was lifted on 10 May 1940 by Lieutenant Jeunehomme of the 3rd Compagnie and his troops, because of the German invasion during World War II.

Route 
The network was in total 115 km long including all the tracks throughout old Beverloo Camp. They went to the barracks, but also to the buildings outside the Infantry or Cavalry Barracks (military bakery, military butchery, military hospital etc) and to the firing range, which was located several kilometers away from the barracks.

Rolling stock

Carriages 
Initially horse-drawn, eight-wheeled Decauville bogie carriages were used.

Steam locomotives 
Later Borsig steam locomotives were used:

Troup transport

References

External links 
 Photos

 
Decauville
Railway lines in Belgium
Railway lines opened in 1879
Railway lines closed in 1940